Conus peasei is a species of sea snail, a marine gastropod mollusk, in the family Conidae, the cone snails and their allies.

References

Conidae